Cody Michael Kolodziejzyk (born 22 November 1990;  ,), known professionally as Cody Ko, is a Canadian YouTuber, podcaster and rapper. His style of content is often crudely comedic and profane. , Kolodziejzyk has over 5.9 million subscribers on his YouTube channel.

After majoring in computer science at Duke University, Kolodziejzyk worked as a mobile developer and began to upload to Vine, garnering almost two million followers on the platform before it closed in 2017. He shifted to uploading commentary videos on YouTube, where he and fellow YouTuber Noel Miller became popular co-hosting their reaction video series That's Cringe and the Tiny Meat Gang Podcast. They also began a comedy rap group of the same name. In 2019, influencer Jake Paul was criticized for accusing Kolodziejzyk of cyberbullying in his commentary videos, inadvertently causing Kolodziejzyk to gain 140 thousand subscribers.

In October 2021, Kolodziejzyk and Miller expanded their podcast into Tiny Meat Gang Studios, a comedy podcast network.

Early life and education 
Cody Michael Kolodziejzyk was born on 22 November 1990 in Calgary, Alberta to Helen and Greg Kolodziejzyk. He enrolled at Duke University in North Carolina after being recruited on their swimming and diving team. 

At Duke, he joined a fraternity and eventually became captain of the varsity team. He eventually came to regret some parts of his time in a fraternity. Kolodziejzyk graduated from Duke University in 2012 with a bachelor's degree in computer science. The same year, he moved to Silicon Valley.

Career

2012–2016: I'd Cap That, computer engineering, and Vine 
In March 2012, Kolodziejzyk began to develop the photo-sharing mobile app I'd Cap That, which automatically added meme-like captions to images. It went viral and was the App Store's Free iOS App Of The Week in May, amassing over four million users in four months. Kolodziejzyk wanted to join a startup and continue developing apps. I'd Cap That was acquired several months later by a startup called Iddiction, and Kolodziejzyk worked there on the app for two years before quitting in 2014. He also moved to San Francisco. 

Kolodziejzyk first began uploading to Vine, a six-second video platform, in 2013. He partnered with the now-defunct multi-channel network Fullscreen, with Mahzad Babayan becoming his full-time talent manager. He credited the network and his background in computer engineering for his early success. In May 2014, Kolodziejzyk and his friend Devon Townsend left on an eight-month backpacking trip in southeast Asia. Throughout the trip, the pair created Vines and started several side projects for ad revenue and experience creating apps with other technologies such as Node.js. The videos were unexpectedly viral and Kolodziejzyk became a popular figure on Vine. He had amassed over 290 thousand followers by July. 

In January 2015, the two returned to the United States. Moving to Los Angeles, they looked for software jobs and continued to make Vines. Kolodziejzyk collaborated with comedian Hannibal Buress to promote Buress' Comedy Central show Why? with Hannibal Buress (2015). By November 2015, he had almost two million followers on the platform. 

Kolodziejzyk worked for the company Victorious for eight months and had less time to create content. He also frequently had to leave midday for auditions. His manager gave him a job as a senior iOS developer at her employer Fullscreen, where they would be more relaxed about him leaving midday for content creation as a social media company. Kolodziejzyk contributed to the code for Fullscreen's subscription service. At Fullscreen, Kolodziejzyk also met Noel Miller, a web designer from marketing and fellow Viner, by chance after they had previously talked online. The pair became close and often created internet content on their lunch breaks.

In June 2016, Kolodziejzyk starred in the Vine-produced series Camp Unplug alongside twelve other Viners. He quit his job at Fullscreen the next month, deciding that he could support himself on sponsorships alone.

2016–2019: YouTube commentary, music, and podcasts 
Kolodziejzyk joined YouTube on 30 May 2014. After Vine was discontinued, he shifted to YouTube content. He and Miller became popular on YouTube with their series That's Cringe, hosted on Kolodziejzyk's channel, where the two react to content they consider dumb. That's Cringe has over 153 million combined views and makes up most of his channel's most popular videos. An episode on controversial YouTuber Jake Paul in October 2017 amassed over seventeen million views. Another episode on the Christian lifestyle channel Girl Defined spurred viral TikTok memes mocking Girl Defined and their videos' themes of extended chastity.

Kolodziejzyk's other content focuses on internet culture, such as criticism of internet personalities, NFTs or ASMR videos involving dangerous acts. He and other commentary YouTubers have been described as "media critics" for an online millennial audience. Vulture said that his videos helped bring attention to YouTube commentary and help it grow from a subsection of reaction videos. Kolodziejzyk is also part of the cast of Jimmy Tatro's web series The Real Bros of Simi Valley, which airs on Facebook Watch. He used to edit his videos himself, but began to hire outside editors and a production team. 

Kolodziejzyk and Miller have made satirical rap songs together as Tiny Meat Gang (TMG) since 2017. Miller dubbed the pair "Tiny Meat Gang" after joking about "the weird idea of an 'unborn child as an ' posing in a sonogram". However, the two began considering music earnestly after they were contacted by producer Diamond Pistols and released their first extended play Bangers & Ass the same year. After struggling with repeated demonetization, Kolodziejzyk and Miller began the Tiny Meat Gang Podcast in October 2017 to make up for losses. The podcast is funded solely by their Patreon supporters, with each hour-long episode discussing various topics related to pop and internet culture. Kolodziejzyk also hosts the podcast Insanely Chill.

In 2018, Kolodziejzyk and Miller went on tour and reached one million subscribers on his main channel in June. In an interview with Tubefilter, Kolodziejzyk attributed his success to "ripping on the Paul brothers." The same year, Post Malone was featured in an episode of their podcast and Tiny Meat Gang released their second EP, Locals Only.

2019–2021: Jake Paul and continued growth 
In early 2019, Tiny Meat Gang won Best Podcast at the 11th Shorty Awards. Kolodziejzyk and Miller also appeared in a sold-out live comedy tour across the United States as Tiny Meat Gang.

After Jake Paul released a vlog confronting Kolodziejzyk, who he called a 'cyberbully', in person on Jeff Wittek's podcast, Paul was widely criticized online and the video received over 800 thousand dislikes. The Washington Post described it as an example of celebrities dismissing genuine criticism as hate. However, Kolodziejzyk gained around 140 thousand subscribers directly after the incident and surpassed four million by late 2019.

Tiny Meat Gang collaborated with Blackbear for the single "short kings anthem". In October, they signed with Arista Records and announced a new EP. On 22 November, Kolodziejzyk partnered with Killer Merch to launch a merchandise collection. Tiny Meat Gang rescheduled their next tour to the second half of 2020.

In October 2020, Kolodziejzyk hosted an eight-episode podcast on iHeartRadio titled The Pleasure is Ours, with guest stars such as Drew Gooden and Emma Chamberlain, in which they discuss truisms and popular sayings.

Adlan Jackson of The New York Times Magazine noted that as Kolodziejzyk and Miller rose in popularity, many of the figures they have mocked appeared in their videos. After criticizing Dhar Mann for his formulaic videos, Kolodziejzyk produced one of his videos and shifted his opinion, saying they were made that way so that his audience, mainly foreigners and children, could understand. Controversial entrepreneur Gary Vaynerchuk also appeared in a 2021 episode of Tiny Meat Gang. Due to this, some fans began to worry about a potential conflict of interest and that the two "would [be incentivized] to pull their punches."

2021–present: Tiny Meat Gang Studios 
In a June 2021 interview, Kolodziejzyk said he intended to develop a media network from the Tiny Meat Gang Podcast. He and Miller co-founded Tiny Meat Gang Studios, a comedy podcast network, in October 2021. They are represented by United Talent Agency, who have assisted in TMG Studios' expansion. The company currently has seven podcasts, including the flagship Tiny Meat Gang Podcast and Insanely Chill. The Tiny Meat Gang Podcast is now divided into two one-hour segments, with the first free and the second available only to subscribers. It had over 200 million downloads in 2022. An October 2022 episode featuring the YouTuber MrBeast became one of the most-viewed episodes of the podcast.

Personal life 
Early in his career, Kolodziejzyk shortened his professional name to Ko, as his Polish surname was too difficult to spell and pronounce.

Kolodziejzyk got engaged to Kelsey Lang Kreppel, a vlogger and fashion YouTuber, on 18 December 2021. They first met in June 2017 and started dating that September. In 2018, they moved in together in an apartment in Marina del Rey, California, and Kreppel started appearing in his videos. In 2020, they purchased their first home in Venice, Los Angeles. On 4 February 2023, Kolodziejzyk and Kreppel got married at the Sands Hotel and Spa in Indian Wells. Their Venice house was put on sale in March, after they bought a house in Malibu last year.

Discography

Solo discography

Singles

TMG discography
As Tiny Meat Gang with Noel Miller.

Extended plays

Singles

Filmography

Awards and nominations

Notes

References

External links 

 Official channel
 Official website
 Official TMG Studios website
 

1990 births
21st-century Canadian comedians
21st-century Canadian male actors
21st-century Canadian male musicians
21st-century Canadian rappers
Arista Records artists
Canadian male comedians
Canadian male rappers
Canadian male web series actors
Canadian people of Polish descent
Canadian podcasters
Canadian YouTubers
Comedy YouTubers
Comedians from Alberta
Commentary YouTubers
Duke Blue Devils men's divers
Duke University Trinity College of Arts and Sciences alumni
Living people
Male actors from Calgary
Musicians from Calgary
Patreon creators
Twitch (service) streamers
Vine (service) celebrities
YouTube channels launched in 2013